Polybotus or Polybotos was a city in the Roman province of Phrygia Salutaris.

History
This town is mentioned in the 6th century by Hierocles in his Synecdemus. It is also prominent in the Alexiad, and the campaigns of Alexios I Komnenos against the Seljuk Turks.

Ecclesiastical history

The city's bishop was a suffragan of Synnada until the 9th century, when it became a suffragan of Amorium, which had become a metropolitan see.

Le Quien mentions two bishops:

Strategius, present at the Council of Chalcedon (451);
St. John the Thaumaturgus, whose feast is celebrated on 5 December and who lived under Leo the Isaurian.

At the Second Council of Nicaea (787), the see was represented by the priest Gregory. 

The earliest Greek Notitia Episcopatuum of the 7th century places the see among the suffragans of Synnada. But from the 9th century until its disappearance as a residential see, it was a suffragan of Amorium.

The bishopric is included in the Catholic Church's list of titular sees.

References

Attribution

Populated places of the Byzantine Empire
Populated places in Phrygia
Catholic titular sees in Asia
Roman towns and cities in Turkey
History of Afyonkarahisar Province
Bolvadin District